The Independence-class littoral mission vessel (LMV) is a class of eight surface platforms that are slated to replace the  of the Republic of Singapore Navy.

Development
On 30 January 2013, MINDEF awarded ST Engineering a contract for the design and build of eight new vessels to replace the s. ST Engineering announced that the group’s marine arm, ST Marine would be the lead system integrator and build the eight vessels at its Singapore Benoi Yard while the group’s electronics arm, ST Electronics, would supply the core combat systems and combat system integration solutions. The first vessel was planned for delivery in 2016 and all eight vessels will be fully operational by 2020. The keel for the first vessel was laid at ST Marine's Benoi Yard on 11 September 2014, officiated by Permanent Secretary (Defence) Chan Yeng Kit. A naming contest was held by MINDEF from 12 February 2015, and the winning names were announced by the Minister for Defence Dr Ng Eng Hen on 15 May 2015.

Design
The Littoral Mission Vessel (LMV) was jointly designed by Saab Kockums AB and ST Marine with Singapore's Defence Science and Technology Agency (DSTA) as the overall manager and systems integrator and was derived from Saab Kockum's FLEXpatrol multi-mission patrol vessel. The design of the LMV was guided by two specific requirements. Due to declining birth rates, manpower had been a critical concern for the Singapore Armed Forces and the design reflects attempts to increase the efficiency of a reduced manning crew from 30 to 23. This was achieved through increased levels of automation and remote monitoring. Another key feature is the Integrated Command Centre which combines the ship's bridge, combat information centre (CIC), and machinery control spaces. The other requirement reflected in the design of the LMV is the need to handle multiple roles, from low intensity conflicts to humanitarian assistance and disaster relief (HADR) operations. The requirement is met through the ability to dynamically reconfigure the LMV through containerised mission packages. The LMV is also equipped with a unique, twin stern slipways from Palfinger Marine for the launch and recovery of RHIBs.

Ships in class

See also
 Littoral combat ship

References

Citations

External links

 Singapore launches seventh Littoral Mission Vessel — Jane’s Navy International, August 20, 2018

Patrol ship classes
Stealth ships
Patrol vessels of the Republic of Singapore Navy
Republic of Singapore Navy